Robert Jefferson Breckinridge Jr. (September 14, 1833 – March 13, 1915) was a prominent Kentucky politician and a member of the Breckenridge political family. He was the son of Robert Jefferson Breckinridge and brother of William Campbell Preston Breckinridge. He was born in Baltimore, Maryland. He served as a colonel in the Confederate Army in the Civil War. He later represented Kentucky in the First Confederate Congress from 1862 to 1864. After the war he served as a judge. He married Katharine Morrison in 1856.

See also
•	Breckinridge family in the American Civil War

•	Kentucky in the American Civil War

External links
http://politicalgraveyard.com/bio/breckinridge.html#R9M0IQCMB

1833 births
1915 deaths
Members of the Confederate House of Representatives from Kentucky
19th-century American politicians
Breckinridge family